Passport to Love is a 2009 Vietnamese romantic comedy directed by Victor Vu. Produced by Infocus Media Group and Wonderboy Entertainment, the film was released on February 13, 2009 in Vietnam. The film won Audience Choice and Best Supporting Actress at Vietnam's 2008 Golden Kite Awards.

Cast
Huy Khanh as Hieu
Binh Minh as Khang
Ngoc Diep as Jennifer
Tang Bao Quyen as Thao
Kathy Uyen as Tiffany
Kim Xuan as Mrs. Kim, Hieu's mother
Nguyen Van Phuc as Mr. Hoang, Khang's father 
Julie Phung Tran as Mrs. Mai, Jennifer's mother
Quoc Hung as Mr. Tam, Jennifer's father
Phuong Anh as Katie, Tiffany's daughter
Huynh Van Dua as Uncle Six
David Ihrig as Officer Mills
Justin Ackerman as Officer Dale
Thanh Van as Tiffany's mother
Mai Son Lam as MC
Nguyen Hau as Restaurant manager
Mai Thanh as Uncle Seven
Tan Thi as Doctor
Dao Thanh Liem as Waiter
Peter Soto as Waiter
Nguyen Kim Ngoc as Khang's maid

References

External links 
 
 
 Passport to Love at AllMovie

2009 films
Vietnamese-language films
2000s English-language films
2009 romantic comedy films
Vietnamese romantic comedy films
Films directed by Victor Vu
Films set in Vietnam
Films set in California
Films shot in Vietnam
Films shot in California
Variance Films films